The P.C. Hooftstraat is a shopping street in Amsterdam, Netherlands. In 1876 it was named after Pieter Corneliszoon Hooft (1581–1647), a Dutch historian, poet and playwright. The street is located in the stadsdeel Amsterdam Oud-Zuid and runs from the Stadhouderskade to the Vondelpark. It is crossed by the Hobbemastraat and the Van Baerlestraat.

In 1883 a horsecar-service started in this street to connect the Dam with the Willemsparkweg, one of the new upper-class neighbourhoods in Amsterdam-Zuid. In 1903 this horsecar was replaced by the new electric tramway line 2. A year later another tramway, line 3, also had the street in its route. This tramway was in existence until tracks were added on the Vondelbrug and both lines were switched to use the shorter route.

In the last decade the P.C. Hooftstraat has developed to become one of the most expensive shopping streets in the Netherlands. Several Dutch and international and exclusive brands have stores here. The following stores are in the street:

 7 For All Mankind
 Agent Provocateur
 Bally
 Brunello Cucinelli
 Bulgari
 Burberry
 Canali
 Cartier
 Chanel
 Chopard
 Christian Louboutin
 Church's
 Corneliani
 Dior
 Dolce & Gabbana
 Emporio Armani
 Ermenegildo Zegna
 Gucci
 Hackett London
 Hermès
 Hugo Boss
 IWC
 Jimmy Choo
 Laurel
 Louis Vuitton
 Michael Kors
 Montblanc
 Moncler
 Oger
 Philipp Plein
 Prada
 Paul Smith
 Ralph Lauren
 Rolex
 Sandro
 Salvatore Ferragamo
 Stone Island
 Tiffany & Co
 Tommy Hilfiger
 Valentino

Apartments here are among the most expensive in the city.

Trivia
 A derogatory term for Sport utility vehicles (SUVs) in Dutch is "PC-Hoofttractor" because these can often be found in the street.
The prize, a 10,000 euro shopping spree in the P.C. Hooftstraat, was won by Nancy Karels.
 In 2008 the P.C. Catwalk Event was held in the P.C. Hooftstraat, with a spectacular 320m long runway.
 There used to be a KRO TV show about the Oud-Zuid area of Amsterdam, in particular the P.C. Hooftstraat. The show was called "Bij ons in de PC" ("In our P.C.") and was presented by Jort Kelder.
 Though the name "P.C. Hooftstraat" is often associated with the P.C. Hooftstraat in Amsterdam, many other places in the Netherlands have a P.C. Hooftstraat, including: Utrecht, Breda, Oss, Nijverdal, Putten, Heemskerk, Hof van Twente, Hengelo, Gemert, Haarlem, Sliedrecht, Papendrecht, Tilburg, Zwijndrecht, Zwolle, Leeuwarden en Vlissingen. Most of these streets are more residential than the one in Amsterdam.

See also
List of streets in Amsterdam

References

External links 

  PCHooftstraat.nl

Shopping districts and streets in the Netherlands
Streets in Amsterdam